Cenotaph is an EP by Bolt Thrower. Tracks 1 and 2 were recorded at Slaughterhouse studios in September 1990, track 3 was recorded at Slaugherhouse studios in July 1989. All three were produced by Colin Richardson and Bolt Thrower. Track 4 was recorded live at Kilburn National on 16 November 1989. It is a rough audience recording, "[...] that we feel captures the atmosphere of the Grindcrusher Tour". It was released on Earache: Mosh 33 in 1990 and has been deleted.

Track listing
All songs written by Bolt Thrower

Personnel
 Karl Willetts - vocals
 Gavin Ward - Guitars
 Barry Thomson - Guitars
 Andrew Whale - drums
 Jo Bench : Bass guitar

Bolt Thrower albums
1990 EPs
Earache Records EPs